Jeon Jun-yong (Hangul: 전준용; born September 25, 1991), better known by his stage name Jero (Hangul: 제로) is a South Korean singer.

Career
Before entering the music scene, Jun-yong attended Anyang Arts High School as a student in the acting department. He made his debut in 2010, known as Junyong in the boy group Touch under YYJ Entertainment, but left in April 2012 to complete his two-year mandatory military service. On July 9, 2014, Jun-yong was announced as a member of YMC Entertainment's new co-ed hip hop group Lucky J, along with Jessi and J'Kyun, under the stage name J-Yo. He left the group in August 2016, to focus on his solo career with the new stage name, Jero. Jero signed to Echo Global Group, where he debuted as a soloist on August 11, 2016, with the single "Airplane". On March 23, 2017 he came out with two more singles, "Delusional" and "Birthday Blu" with their own respected music videos as well. He then came out with his fifth single, "Traffic Light" on June 21, 2017. In 2018 he releases his sixth single, "Flower Bomb." He also released his seventh single, "Save Me" featuring Park Jimin (15&).

Discography

Singles

References

External links

1991 births
Living people
South Korean hip hop singers
21st-century South Korean  male singers
South_Korean_male_idols